Christopher Oghenebrorie Okotie (born 16 June 1958) is a Nigerian televangelist and the pastor of the Household of God Church International Ministries, a Pentecostal congregation in Lagos since February 1987.

Personal life
Okotie was born to Francis Idje and Cecilia Okotie, in Ethiope-West, Delta State (then Bendel State). As a growing child, he always loved to sing. While in secondary school at Edo College, Benin City, he belonged to the school's Music Club and usually entertained groups of people. He never considered commercialising his talent until his first year at university, when his father died. His hobbies include jogging, martial arts and music.

Education and career 
He attended secondary school at Edo College, Benin City.  In 1984, he graduated with a degree in law from the University of Nigeria at Nsukka.  Okotie abandoned his schooling for a while to pursue a pop music career before his returning abruptly. Okotie married twice and announced he has separated from his second wife on June 24, 2012.

He returned to school to complete his education and graduated with a law degree. Whilst undergoing law school he interrupted his schooling again to begin his religious ministries. Okotie attended the Grace Fellowship Bible School in Tulsa, Oklahoma, and, soon after, established the Household of God Ministry.

In 1990, Okotie established the annual Karis Awards, hosted by his church, to recognize and financially reward Nigerian citizens.

Corona Virus 
When the government of Nigeria declared the reopening of churches in August 2020 but made it compulsory for members to put on their nose masks or face shield, Pastor Okotie condemned the idea of using face shield claiming it would be a reversal of the veil that was broken on the day Christ died and therefore creating a separation between men and God.

Grace programme/Karis Award
The GRACE Program/ Karis Award is an annual charity event hosted at the church where he pastors; The HouseHold of God International Ministries, Lagos. The guiding philosophy being that greatness does not consist in being great but in the ability to make others great. The Karis Award gives recognition to, while financially rewarding Nigerians who had offered distinguished service to the nation, but are not recognized nor rewarded for their contributions to the nation building. Some recipients are, Prof. Chike Obi, the mathematician (1996), D.I.G. Chris Omeben, a retired policeman (1997), Mr. Taiwo Akinwunmi who designed the national flag (1998), Hogan Bassey, former Commonwealth and World boxing champion (1999), Chief Michael Imodou, the Labour leader (2000), Chief Margaret Ekpo (2001), nationalist and woman activist, Mallam Aminu Kano, nationalist (2004)and Isaac Adaka Boro, human rights activist (2005).

The GRACE Program also makes regular cash and material contributions to charity organizations such as the SOS Children Village, the Sunshine Foundation, Pacelli School for the Blind and Partially Sighted and Little Saints Orphanage, Spinal Cord Injuries Association of Nigeria, and The Childcare Trust.

Wealth
In 2011, Forbes estimated his net worth at US$3–10 million.

Presidential runs

Okotie first ran for the President under the banner of the Justice Party (JP), led by Ralph Obiorah after he was schemed out of the National Democratic Party (NDP) primaries elections; he lost to Olusegun Obasanjo in the May 2003 elections. He ran again in 2007 on the platform of a party he founded, Fresh Democratic party, FRESH and lost to Umaru Yar'Adua in the May 2007 elections. Then in 2011, he ran and lost to the President Goodluck Jonathan.

Controversies
Okotie had a public spat with fellow Nigerian cleric T.B. Joshua, referring to him as a 'deceptive magician'.

Publications 
Okotie has published books and is a regular contributor to several Nigerian newspapers.
The Last Outcast (Best selling book, 2001)
A terror war beyond hashtags
A conference of geriatrics
In search of game changers
Power shift: what my readers say
Why Vision 20:2020 became a lost cause
State policies and prophetic solutions
Adadevoh and the Ebola crisis
A Government stuck in timing response snafu
This present assault on education
Rage over villaleaks et al
Time to shift Governance paradigm
2015: Imperative of the paradigm shift option
ASUU strike: implications of political infidelity
Counting the cost of insecurity
The looming demographic time bomb
Reclaiming Nigeria's lost hope

References

External links
Household of God Church website
Fresh Democratic Party website
Rev Chris Okotie website

1958 births
Living people
People from Delta State
Nigerian evangelicals
Nigerian television evangelists
Fresh Democratic Party politicians
Candidates in the Nigerian general election, 2003
University of Nigeria alumni
Nigerian Pentecostal pastors
Delta State politicians